Shyamaprasad Mukherjee, FNASc, known as S. P. Mukherjee (born 16 June 1939), is an Indian statistician and the former Centenary Professor of Statistics at the University of Calcutta. He is currently a visiting professor at University of Calcutta after retiring formally as the Centenary Professor of Statistics in 2004. He is currently serving as the Chairman of Expert Group conducting All-India surveys under the Labour Bureau.

Early life and education
He was born in Kidderpore, Kolkata, India. In 1954 he appeared in his school final (10th grade) examination and was ranked second in the state of West Bengal. He received an M.Sc. in Statistics in 1960 and Ph.D. in Statistics in 1967 from University of Calcutta. After a short stint of teaching in the Presidency College, Calcutta, he joined the  University of Calcutta as a lecturer in Statistics in 1964.

Academic career
Prof Mukherjee has done extensive research work in Applied Probability, Parametric and Bayesian Estimation, Reliability Analysis, Quality Management, and Operations Research; published more than sixty research papers and review and expository articles; and supervised twenty one Ph. D. students.
He was the President of the Operational Research Society of India as well as of the Association of Asian-Pacific Operational Research Societies (APORS).  He was also a Vice-President of the International Federation of Operational Research Societies (IFORS). He has been the President  of the Calcutta Statistical Association. He has served as the Chairman of the Committee on Statistical Methods for Quality and Reliability of the Bureau of Indian Standards. He is the president of the Indian Association for Productivity, Quality and Reliability (IAPQR)  as well as the editor of IAPQR Transactions and is associated with the editorial work of several other journals.

Areas of research contributions
 Applied probability
 Parametric and Bayesian estimation
 Reliability
 Quality management
 Operations research

Books authored
 Graduate Employment and Higher Education in West Bengal
 Frontiers in Probability and Statistics
 Quality: Domains and Dimensions
 Statistical Methods in Social Science Research<ref></ref>
 A Guide to Research Methodology: An Overview of Research Problems, Tasks and Methods Decision-making: Concepts, Methods and Techniques''

Awards and medals
 Prof P V Sukhatme Award for Senior Statisticians June 2012
 P C Mahalanobis Birth Centenary Award January 2000
 Fellow of ISPS 2012

References

Indian statisticians
1939 births
Living people
Presidency University, Kolkata alumni
University of Calcutta alumni
20th-century Indian mathematicians
Bengali mathematicians
Academic staff of the University of Calcutta
Scientists from Kolkata